William Hay, 6th Earl of Erroll  (1521 – 11 April 1541), styled as Lord Hay until age 1, was a Scottish peer.

Biography

William Hay was the son of the William Hay, 5th Earl of Erroll. He had double royal lineage, descended from Kings Robert II of Scotland and James I of Scotland.

He inherited the titles in 1522 at just a year old.  As he died under the age of 21, the barony of Errol, Perthshire, were held by the crown all his life.

Marriage and issue

William Hay married Lady Helen (whose name also appears as "Elenor" and "Helenor") Stewart, eldest daughter of John Stewart, 3rd Earl of Lennox. They had one daughter:

Lady Jean Hay (1540), who married Andrew Hay, 8th Earl of Erroll.

The Earl of Erroll died on 11 April 1541, in Edinburgh, being under 21 years of age. His wife Helen later remarried John Gordon, 11th Earl of Sutherland.

Six months after his death, the earldom and barony were restored to his cousin, George Hay, the grandson of William Hay, 3rd Earl of Erroll.

Ancestry

References

 

1521 births
1541 deaths
16th-century Scottish people
06
William, 06